Schiefergebirge (before 31 December 2013: Probstzella-Lehesten-Marktgölitz) is a Verwaltungsgemeinschaft ("municipal association") in the district Saalfeld-Rudolstadt, in Thuringia, Germany. It takes its name from the Thüringer Schiefergebirge. The seat of the Verwaltungsgemeinschaft is in Probstzella.

The Verwaltungsgemeinschaft Schiefergebirge consists of the following municipalities:
Gräfenthal
Lehesten
Probstzella

References

Verwaltungsgemeinschaften in Thuringia